Langerra is a spider genus of the jumping spider family, Salticidae.

While L. oculina is only known from females, only the male of L. longicymbia has been described.

The first L. oculina was beaten from bushes in forest of Vietnam. It was four millimeters long. Its carapace is orange-brown with a lighter patch towards the posterior margin. Around the front median eyes it is dark brown, the other eyes are surrounded black. The grey opisthosoma darkens posteriorly. The first two pairs of legs are dark orange with yellow tarsi, the other two pairs are lighter.

Species
 Langerra longicymbia Song & Chai, 1991 – China
 Langerra oculina Zabka, 1985 – China, Vietnam

Footnotes

References
  (2000): An Introduction to the Spiders of South East Asia. Malaysian Nature Society, Kuala Lumpur.
  (2007): The world spider catalog, version 8.0. American Museum of Natural History.

Salticidae
Spiders of Asia
Salticidae genera